Harrison Charles Dunk (born 25 October 1990) is an English professional footballer who plays as a left back or left midfielder for  club Cambridge United.

Career
Dunk was born in Hammersmith, Greater London. He joined Bromley on 7 August 2009, after being spotted in an under-18 tournament in Germany, following time with AFC Wimbledon. He featured regularly for the club in his debut campaign, and was also selected the club's Player of the Season.

On 7 June 2011, after picking up another Player of the Season award with Bromley, Dunk joined Cambridge United. He renewed his link with the U's on 23 March 2014.

On 9 August 2014, Dunk played his first match in the Football League, starting in a 1–0 home win against Plymouth Argyle. On 8 January 2018, Dunk became Cambridge United's longest serving player after defender Josh Coulson left the club for Leyton Orient. Dunk made his 300th appearance for Cambridge on 13 August 2019 in a League Cup first round tie against Brentford in which Cambridge won on penalties. He made his 300th league appearance against Scunthorpe on 17 October 2020 with United winning 5–0.

Career statistics

References

External links
Cambridge official profile

1990 births
Living people
Footballers from Hammersmith
English footballers
Association football defenders
Association football midfielders
Bromley F.C. players
Cambridge United F.C. players
National League (English football) players
English Football League players